Dimension Intrusion is the debut studio album by Canadian electronic music producer Richie Hawtin, credited under the alias F.U.S.E. It was released in June 1993 by Plus 8 and Warp, serving as the fifth album in Warp's Artificial Intelligence series.

Critical reception

Fact described Dimension Intrusion as "a record which really demonstrates Hawtin's range as a producer" and "one of his most melodic, immediate works". AllMusic stated that the album alternates between "minimalist stompers [and] more melodic, contemplative material," which made Hawtin "a perfect match for the other producers in Warp's Artificial Intelligence series."

In 2012, Fact placed it at number 38 on its list of the "100 Best Albums of the 1990s".

Track listing

Personnel
Richie Hawtin – production, editing
Matthew Hawtin – artwork

Charts

References

External links
 
 Dimension Intrusion at Warp

1993 albums
Richie Hawtin albums
Warp (record label) albums